Temple tanks are wells or reservoirs built as part of the temple complex near Indian temples. They are called pushkarini, kalyani, kunda, sarovara, tirtha, talab, pukhuri, ambalakkuḷam, etc. in different languages and regions of India. Some tanks are said to cure various diseases and maladies when bathed in. It is possible that these are cultural remnants of structures such as the Great Bath of Mohenjo-daro or Dholavira, which was part of the Indus Valley civilization. Some are stepwells with many steps at the sides.

Tank design
Since ancient times, the design of water storage has been important in India's temple architecture, especially in western India where dry and monsoon seasons alternate. Temple tank design became an art form in itself. An example of the art of tank design is the large, geometrically spectacular Stepped Tank at the Royal Center at the ruins of Vijayanagara, the capital of the Vijayanagara Empire, surrounding the modern town of Hampi.  It is lined with green diorite and has no drain. It was filled by aqueduct.

The tanks are used for ritual cleansing and during rites of consecration. The water in the tank is deemed to be sacred water from the Ganges River.

Stepwell
In India, a stepwell is a deep masonry well with steps going down to the water level in the well. It is called a  vav in west India and a baoli in north India. Some were built by kings and were richly ornamented.

Haridra Nadhi 

Haridra Nadhi, tank of the Rajagopalaswamy Temple, Mannargudi, is one of the largest temple tanks in India. It's in Mannargudi, Thiruvarur District of Tamil Nadu. 

The area of the temple tank is 23 acres (93,000 m2). It is also called Daughter of Kaveri river.

Kalyani 
Kalyani, also called pushkarni, are ancient Hindu stepped bathing wells.

These wells were typically built near Hindu temples to accommodate bathing and cleansing activities before prayer. They are also used for immersion of Ganesha idols during Ganesha Chaturthi.

In Sikhism
In Sikhism, temple tanks are called sarovar (Punjabi: ਸਰੋਵਰ sarōvara).

Gallery

See also
 Brahma Sarovar
 Ghat
 Baray
 Tank cascade system (Sri Lanka)
 Sacred waters

Notes

Further reading
 C.P.R. Environmental Education Centre (2002). Sacred tanks of South India. pp. 328.

External links

 ENVIS Centre for Conservation of Ecological Heritage and Sacred Sites of India: Sacred Waterbodies of India

Hindu temple architecture
 
Water and Hinduism